Mönckebergstraße  station is a Hamburg U-Bahn station located on the Mönckebergstraße in Hamburg-Altstadt. It first opened in 1912.

References

External links 
 
 Mönckebergstraße på hamburger-untergrundbahn.de

Hamburg U-Bahn stations in Hamburg
U3 (Hamburg U-Bahn) stations
Buildings and structures in Hamburg-Mitte
Railway stations in Germany opened in 1912